Ash Hill may refer to:

Ash Hill (Maryland), a historic house in Maryland
Ash Hill, Missouri, an unincorporated community
Ash Hill, North Carolina, an unincorporated community
Ash Hill, New Zealand, a volcanic cone
 Ash Hill, California, an unincorporated community